The Serbian consulate in Bitola was established in 1889 after diplomatic conferences between the Kingdom of Serbia and the Ottoman Empire. Serbian consulates opened in the seats of the vilayets of Kosovo (Pristina), Manastir (Bitola) and Salonica (Thessaloniki). The Bitola council officially opened on May 9, 1889 with the mission to protect the interests of Serbs in the area, working on opening Serbian schools, etc.

Background

Serbian national work in Old Serbia and Macedonia reached better results at the end of the 1860s and beginning of 1870s, increasing after the Great Eastern Crisis with the Austro-Hungarian occupation of Bosnia and Herzegovina and troop deployment in the Sanjak of Novi Pazar. The Society of St. Sava (est. 1886) and an educational department (est. March 1887) would handle the greater part of educational-cultural work, while Stojan Novaković, the Serbian Minister in Constantinople (1886–91), led the educational-cultural work, in effect, through the consulates of Skopje (1887), Thessaloniki (1887), Pristina (1889) and Bitola (1889). The main tasks of the consulates were to open schools, establish church-educational municipalities, Serbian bookshops and spreading Serbian literature, and educating Macedonians. Novaković prepared the opening of schools and church-educational municipalities within the Ecumenical Patriarchate in spring 1887. It was stressed that the Greek metropolitans were to help the Serbian consulates and overall Serbian activity in the Ottoman Empire.

The establishment of the Bulgarian Exarchate in 1870 had led to a schism in the Patriarchate and a boost to Bulgarian national aspirations in the Balkans. The return of Bulgarian bishops to the eparchies of Skopje, Ohrid and Veles at the end of the 1880s alarmed the Serbian and Greek diplomacy. Bulgarian politicians had a goal of implementing the borders drafted in the Treaty of San Stefano (1878). Novaković met with Ottoman representatives to whom he opposed placing the Bulgarian bishops, however, two Bulgarian bishops arrived at Ohrid and Skopje in 1890, which nevertheless prompted pursuing Serbian national interests in Macedonia. When asked by an Austro-Hungarian minister on the "ethnographic situation" he described the Macedonians as a transitional link between Serbs and Bulgarians, similar to Little Russia and Provence. Novaković started negotiations over the determination of spheres of interest in Macedonia with the arrival of Greek minister Nikolaos Mavrocordatos in Constantinople (1889).

History

Consuls
Dimitrije Bodi (1889–1895)
Milivoje Vasiljević (1895–1896)
Milojko Veselinović (1897–1899)
Mihailo Ristić (1899–1903)
Svetislav Stanojević (1903–1907)
Živojin Balugdžić (1907)
Ljubomir Mihailović (1907–1912)

See also
Serbian consulate in Pristina
Serbian consulate in Skopje
Serbian consulate in Thessaloniki
Serb Democratic League

References

Sources

Serbs from the Ottoman Empire
Ottoman period in the history of North Macedonia
Serb organizations
History of Bitola
1889 establishments in the Ottoman Empire
Serbian nationalism in North Macedonia